Bosea massiliensis is a bacterium from the genus of Bosea which was isolated in Marseille in France.

References

External links
Type strain of Bosea massiliensis at BacDive -  the Bacterial Diversity Metadatabase

 

Hyphomicrobiales
Bacteria described in 2003